"Tears Don't Fall" is a song  
by Welsh heavy metal band Bullet for My Valentine. It is the band's fourth single from their first full-length studio album, The Poison. The single was released on 17 June 2006 through Trustkill Records in the US. The song won the Kerrang! Award for Best Single. The song peaked at No. 24 on the Hot Mainstream Rock chart and No. 32 on the Alternative Rock chart. In 2013, the band released a sequel to the song called "Tears Don't Fall (Part 2)" on their fourth studio album, Temper Temper.

Music video

The music video, directed by Tony Petrossian, shows the band playing in a place with heavy rain. The story of the video shows a woman and the man, who are seen doing romantic things with each other but when the woman (Taylor Cole) tries to continue the following day, the man won't let her as he seems to be tired of her. After a while of driving, the car loses fuel. After refueling the car, the woman tries to get close to the man and causes him to drop the barrel of fuel. He pushes her away, but the barrel has emptied, with the fuel spilled onto the ground. The man then gets in the car and drives away, leaving the girl running after the car. The man stops at a hotel, goes in and finds a blonde woman to replace the previous woman he left behind. The previous woman finally manages to walk to where the man is staying. She then enters the hotel room with the barrel he dropped earlier and proceeds to drench the new couple and herself with gasoline to commit murder-suicide by immolation. She then pulls out a lighter and drops it onto the bed but it doesn't ignite. The woman then smiles and blows a sarcastic kiss to the terrified pair cowering on the bed now realizing they were not going to die.  The camera then shifts outside to a hose dripping water indicating she had used the hose to fill the barrel with water.

The other video again starts with the band playing in the rain. The story shows a man and woman doing romantic things in the car with the ex-girlfriend watching them in rage and sadness. Heartbroken and in tears, the ex goes to seek help from a voodoo witch doctor who makes her go through a ritual to put her in a blinding trance of anger, before finally receiving a voodoo doll cursed to imitate the man. In rage, she starts stabbing the doll, causing the man to feel the pain, then the doll falls into a pit of fire, which caused the car to explode, killing the man and woman inside.

As of October 2022, the song has 214 million views on YouTube.

Critical reception 

"Tears Don't Fall" is one of Bullet for My Valentine's most popular songs and is often regarded as one of the band's greatest songs. Since the release of The Poison, it has become a staple to their live set and usually draws in the most crowd response, most notably during the intro, bridge and guitar solo. It was featured in the band's live DVDs: The Poison: Live at Brixton, Rock am Ring 2006, Scream Aim Fire: Live at London Alexandria and Live from Brixton: Chapter Two. Upon writing and recording for the band's fourth studio album Temper Temper, Bullet for My Valentine created a poll asking fans if they would like a sequel to any of their songs. "Tears Don't Fall" drew the most response, thus a sequel was released entitled "Tears Don't Fall (Part 2)".

Track listings 
"Tears Don't Fall" was released as a single in the UK in multiple different formats: two CD singles and one 7" LP single. All three formats were released on 17 July 2006 through Visible Noise Records. The individual track listings are as follows:

CD1
 "Tears Don't Fall" – 4:40
 "Domination"  – 5:06
An unreleased version of the "Tears Don't Fall" music video
A desktop wallpaper

CD2
 "Tears Don't Fall"  – 6:12
 "4 Words (To Choke Upon)"  – 3:53
 "Suffocating Under Words of Sorrow (What Can I Do)"  – 4:01

7" vinyl
 "Tears Don't Fall" – 4:40
 "Welcome Home (Sanitarium)"  – 6:17

German EP
 "Tears Don't Fall" – 4:40
 "Domination"  – 5:06
 "Welcome Home (Sanitarium)"  – 6:17
 "Suffocating Under Words of Sorrow (What Can I Do)"  – 4:02
 "4 Words (To Choke Upon)"  – 3:52

Online downloads
 "Tears Don't Fall"

Charts

Certifications

Personnel 
Matthew "Matt" Tuck – lead vocals, rhythm and lead guitar
Michael "Padge" Paget – lead guitar, backing vocals
Michael "Moose" Thomas – drums
Jason "Jay" James - bass guitar, backing vocals

References

External links
  Official music video

2006 singles
2005 songs
Bullet for My Valentine songs
Music videos directed by Tony Petrossian
Songs written by Matthew Tuck
Emo songs